Aron Iosifovich Katsenelinboigen (September 2, 1927 – July 30, 2005) was a founder of predispositioning theory, a subject in decision theory and systems theory that models development in the context of uncertainty.

Career 

Katsenelinboigen was born in Izyaslavl in the Ukrainian SSR. At fourteen, he enrolled at the Uzbekistan Institute of Economics, transferring four years later, in 1945, to the Moscow State Institute of Economics. There he graduated the following year and spent a further three years pursuing post-graduate work. He received a PhD in Economics in 1957 and became a Doctor of Economic Science in 1966.

In 1973, Katsenelinboigen emigrated to the United States, where he continued to research indeterministic economics and develop predispositioning theory. He became a United States citizen in 1979. He also began to explore the application of predispositioning theory in fields other than economics, such as biology, psychology and theology. From 1990, when Vera Zubarev became one of his pupils, he and she began researching its application in literature and art.

In 1974, after a brief sojourn at the University of California, Berkeley, Katsenelinboigen joined the Department of Economics at the University of Pennsylvania. During this time, he was also a visiting professor at Princeton University, where he presented a course on the Soviet economy. In 1977, he joined the Wharton School's Department of Social Systems Sciences and became a full professor before moving to the Department of Decision Sciences in 1987. He retired in 2004.

Katsenelinboigen's use of positional and combinational styles of chess as metaphors for the mental processes underlying decision-making continue to be taught by Zubarev at the University of Pennsylvania.

Positions 

 Professor, Decision Sciences Department, University of Pennsylvania, 1987-2005.
 Chairman, Social Systems Sciences Department, University Pennsylvania, 1985-1986.
 Professor, Social Systems Sciences Department, University of Pennsylvania, 1981-1987.
 Research Professor, Social System Sciences, University of Pennsylvania, April 1978 – 1980.
 Visiting Lecturer, Department of Economics, University of Pennsylvania, 1974-1978.
 Visiting Lecturer, Department of Economics, Princeton University, 1977.
 Visiting Research Economist, University of California, Berkeley, January–August, 1974.
 Professor, Economic School, Moscow State University, 1970-1973.
 Head of the Department of Complex Systems, Central Economic-Mathematical Institute, U.S.S.R.Academy of Sciences, 1966-1973.
 Senior Research Fellow, Central Economic-Mathematical Institute, U.S.S.R. Academy of Sciences, 1963-1965.
 Senior Research Fellow, Institute of Economics, U.S.S.R. Academy of Sciences, 1960-1963.
 Research Fellow, Institute of Economics, U.S.S.R. Academy of Sciences, 1956-1959.
 Research Fellow, Institute of Aviation Technology, Moscow, 1956.
 Research Fellow, Institute of Ceramics, Moscow, 1953-1955.
 Teacher at Booksale Vocational School, Moscow, 1951-1952.
 Consultant at the Collector of Public Libraries, Moscow, 1951.
 Planner, "Freser" factory, Moscow, 1950-1951.
 Planner, "Kaliber" factory, Moscow, 1949.

Grants
 Ford Foundation, Research Competition in Soviet/Russian and East European Studies 1975. For two years (1975–1977). The topic of investigations "The Price-Command Mechanism in the Soviet Economic System."
 A.C.L.S., For the Fall Semester of 1977/1978 academic year. The topic of investigations "Vertical and Horizontal Mechanisms in the Soviet Economic System."
 National Council for Soviet and Eastern European Studies. For the 1980-1982 academic years. The topic of investigations "Towards the Concept of Measuring An Economic Potential: The Soviet-American Case."
 University of Pennsylvania 1987. For the purpose of developing a research agenda on a new topic area: indeterminism.
 University of Pennsylvania 1992. For organization of the International symposium "Calculus of Predisposition".
 University of Pennsylvania 1993. For the development of a new concept concerning mechanisms of evolutionary change (normal and pathological)
 SEI Center at the Wharton School, University of Pennsylvania 1994. For the development of a new concept concerning the political system of a corporation

Honored positions
 Senior Fellow, Foreign Policy Research Institute, Philadelphia.
 Member of the ACTR/ACCELS National Board of Senior Advisers

Books

 Automation of Production Processes and Problems of the Organization of Labor, Moscow,"Mashgis," 1956, pp. 1–143. (in Russian)
 The Economic Effectiveness of Complex Mechanization and Automation in Machine Building, Moscow,"Ekonomica,"1959, pp. 1-233. (in Russian)
 The Calculation of Cost of Production in Automated Processes. Moscow, "Finizdat," 1958, pp. 1–87. (in Russian)
 Optimality and the Mechanism of Prices, (together with I. Lakhman and Iu. Ovsienko). Moscow: "Nauka," 1969, pp. 1–124. (in Russian)
 Methodological Problems of the Optimal Planning of a Socialist Economy, (together with Iu.Ovsienko and E.Faerman). Moscow, TSEMI, Academy of Sciences of the U.S.S.R., 1966, pp. 1–246. (in Russian)
 Studies in Soviet Economic Planning, White Plains: M.E. Sharpe Publisher, 1978, pp. 1–229.
 Soviet Economic Thought and Political Power in the U.S.S.R., NY: Pergammon Press, 1980, pp. 1–229.
 Some New Trends in Systems Theory, Seaside, CA.: Intersystems Publications, 1984, pp. 1–269.
 Basic Economics and Optimality (together with S. Movshovich, Iu.Ovsienko), Seaside, CA: Intersystems Publications, 1987, pp. 1–225. The Russian version of the book Growth and Economic Optimum, Moscow: "Nauka," 1972, pp. 1–152.
 Vertical and Horizontal Mechanisms as a System Phenomenon, Seaside, CA: Intersystems Publications,1988, pp. 1–350.
 Soviet Political and Economic System, vol.1, pp. 7–237; vol.2, pp. 5–276; vol.3, pp. 5–311, Benson: Chalidze Publ., 1988. (In Russian).
 Selected Topics in Indeterministic Systems, Seaside, CA: Intersystems Publications, 1989, pp. 1–336.
 The Soviet Union: Empire, Nation, and System. New Brunswick:Transactions, 1990, pp. 1–471.
 The Aesthetic Method in Economics. Benson: Chalidze Publ., 1990, pp. 1–392. (In Russian).
 Indeterministic Economics. New York: Praeger Publ., 1992,
 Russia: Problems and Conflicts. Philadelphia: The Coast Publ., 1993, pp. 1–87. (In Russian).
 Evolutionary Change; Toward a Systemic Theory of Development and Maldevelopment. Newark: Gordon & Breach Publishing Group, 1997, pp. 1–217.
 The Concept of Indeterminism & Its Applications; Economics,Social Systems, Ethics, Artificial Intelligence & Aesthetics. Westport: Greenwood Publishing Group, 1997
 A Conceptual Understanding of Beauty. Lewiston, NY: The Edwin Mellen Press, 2003
 18 Questions And Answers Concerning The Torah, 2007
 "ВОСПОМИНАНИЯ: "О Времени, О Людях, О Себе"

Books edited
 Popovsky, M., On the Other Side of the Planet, vol.1,Philadelphia:Coast, 1994, pp. 1–388 (In Russian).
 Popovsky, M., On the Other Side of the Planet, vol.2, Philadelphia: Coast, 1995, pp. 1–468 (In Russian).
 Popovsky, M., On the Other Side of the Planet, vol.3,Philadelphia: Coast, 1996, pp. 1–426 (In Russian).
 An Aesthetic Approach to Live, History, Society, Business, Science, Art & Literature (together with Matthew Mandelbaum). Philadelphia: Friends of Art, 1997, pp. 1–254

Translations

 “How Keynes Came to America” by John Kenneth Galbraith. Stamford, CT: The Overbrook Press, 1965, pp. 3–18. Translated from English into Russian and published in Ekonomika I Matematicheskie Metody, vol.33, no 4, 1997, pp. 66–73.

Selected articles
 "Calculations of Norms of Inventories on the Mass Production Lines," Card Catalog TESKO, No. 434/4, Moscow, 1950, pp. 1–6.
 "Concerning Higher Qualifications for Workers on the Production Line," Vestnik Mashinostroeniia, no. 9,1950, pp. 62–65.
 The Problems of Tariff Scales for Jobs and Workers when Introducing the New Methods of Labor Organization," Vestnik Mashinostroeniia, no. 11, 1954, pp. 78-79.
 "The Possibilities for Increasing the Labor Productivity on the Ceramic Factories," Steklo i Keramica, no. 11, 1954, pp. 23–23.
 “Discovered Reserves,” Stroitel’naya Gasetta, March 13, 1955.
 “Automation of Production Processes in Machinbuilding Industry and Organization of Labor?” Cotsialistichesky Trud, no.1 1957, pp. 9–17.
 "Technological Progress and Its Influence on the Cultural Level of Workers," Filosfskie Nauki, no. 4, 1959, pp. 14–22.
 "Application Mathematical Methods in Economic Investigations" Vestnik Akademii Nauk U.S.S.R., no. 4, 1959, pp. 14–22.
 “Automation and Economics,” Newspaper Sovetskaya Rossiya, August 18, 1959.
 “Technological Progress and the Reduction of Expenditures in Manufacturing Industries,” Cotsialistichesky Trud, no.11 1959, pp. 42–49.
 “The Economic Effectiveness of Complex Mechanization and Automation in Machine Building,” Problems of Economics, no.11 1959, pp. 85–99.
 “Problems of Labor under Automation,” Cotsialistichesky Trud, No11 1960, pp. 76–80.
 “The Economic Effectiveness of Complex Mechanization and Automation in Machine Building,” in Socio-Economic Problems of Technological Progress (Materials ofScientific Session of the Economic, Philosophical, and Judicial departments of the Academy of Sciences of USSR,) Moscow: Nauka, 1961, pp. 81–104.
 “Some  Methodological Problems Concerning Analysis of Labor Organization Under Complex Automation of Production Processes,” in Economic Problems of Automation of Industrial Production,” Moscow: Mashgiz, 1961, pp.206-214.
 "Main Problems of Raising Workers Skills Under Conditions of Intensive Technological Progress." In Industry and Labor in the U.S.S.R, G.V. Osipov (ed.), London, Travistock Publications, 1966, pp. 207–222; in Industria y Trabajo en la URSS. La Habana: 1975 (in Spanish).
 "Certain Theoretical Aspects of Optimal Planning of National Economy." Matekon, Vol. II, no. 4, 1966, pp. 3–18.
 "The Problem of Application Mathematics in Economic Theory," Voprosy Ekonomiki, no. 4, 1967, pp. 98–107.
 "Centralism and Economic Autonomy in a Socialist Economy" Matekon, Vol. IV, no. 4, 1968, pp. 3–29.
 “Toward Coordination and Self-acting.” In  Informatsionnyj Bulleten’ no.9, 1968. Moskva: Nauchny Sovet Academii Nauk USSR  po Problemam    Concretnykh  Sociologicheskikh Issledovanij, pp. 99–109.
 "Methodological Problems of Control of Complex Systems," Problemy Metodologii Systemnykh Issledovanij. Moscow: "MYSL," 1970, pp. 87– 124.
 "Optimal Control and the Price Mechanism," Matekon, Vol. VI, no. 3, 1970, pp. 260–285.
 "Capital Charges in Optimal Economic Models," Matekon, Vol. VII, no. 4, 1971, pp. 370–390.
 An Introduction to the Russian Translation of the book E. Fels, G. Intner, Methodik Der Wirtschaftwissenschaft, "Progress," Moscow, 1971, pp. 5–21.
 "Concerning Some General and Particular Aspects of Different Levels of Management in the Socialistic Economy," Modeling of Economic Processes, Moscow State University Publisher, 1972, pp. 61–101 (in Russian).
 "Systems Analysis and the Problem of Values," Sistemnye Issledovaniia, Moscow, "Nauka," 1972, pp. 3–25.
 "On the Various Methods of Describing the Socialist Economy," Matekon, Vol. X, no. 2, 1973, pp. 3–25.
 "Systemanalyse and Wertlehre," Ideen des Exakten Wissens, West Germany, No. 5, 1973, pp. 283–290.
 "General Systems Theory and Axiology," General Systems, Vol. XIX, 1974, pp. 19–26.
 "Constructing the Potential of a System," General System, Vol. XIX, 1974, pp. 27–36.
 "Variations in Means of Description of Economic Systems," Collective Phenomena and the Applications of Physics to Other Fields of Science, Prepared for delivery at a Seminar "Moscow," U.S.S.R., 1-15, July, 1974, Brain Rese arch Publications, 1975, pp. 38–44.
 "Disguised Inflation in the Soviet Union: The Relationship between Soviet Income Growth and Price Increased in the Postwar Period," The Socialist Price Mechanism, ed. by A. Abouchar. Durham, N.C.: Duke University Press, 19 77, pp. 171–183; the short version of this article may be seen in Economic Aspects of Life in the U.S.S.R. Main Findings of Colloquium held 29–31 January 1975 in Brussels. NATO-Directorate of Economic Affairs, 1975, pp. 101–111.
 "The Potential of a System," Systems Thinking and the Quality of Life, Proceedings of the 1975 Annual North American Meeting of the Society for General Systems Research, New York City, January 27–30, pp. 50–54.
 Comments on Professor Vsevolod Holubnychy, "The Present State of Cybernetics and Republic - Level economic Planning." Ukraine in the Seventies (ed. Peter J. Potichny's), Mosaic Press, Oakville, Ontario, 1975, pp. 97–101.
 "Conflicting Trends in Soviet Economics in the Post Stalin Era," The Russian Review, Vol. 35, no. 4, 1976, pp. 373–399.
 "Market and Plan, Plan and Market: The Soviet Case," Papers and Proceedings of the Eighty-ninth Annual Meeting of the American Economic Association, September 16–18, 1976, Atlantic City, NJ, pp. 61–66, The Soviet Econom y, Continuity and Change, ed. by M. Bornstein, Westview Press, CO, 1981, pp. 61–70.
 "Colored Markets in the Soviet Union," Soviet Studies, Vol. XXIX, no. 1, 1977, pp. 62–85. The enlarged version of this article is published in Internal Contradiction in the USSR, no. 2, 1982, Chalidze Publications, pp. 54–132, (in Russian).
 "Soviet Science and the Economists/Planners," Soviet Science and Technology: Domestic and Foreign Perspectives. Published for the National Science Foundation by the George Washington University, Washington, D.C., 1977, pp. 230–242. The revised version of this article was published in Survey, Vol. 1, No.1 (102), Winter 1977-1978, pp. 42–52. USSR: Internal Contradictions, no. 11, 1984, pp. 243–268 (In Russian).
 "Some Observations on the Plan-Market Relationship in Centrally Planned Economies," The Annals of the American Academy of Political and Social Science, Vol. 434, November 1977, pp. 186–198.
 "Economics and the Problem of Values," The Annals of the Ukrainian Academy of Arts and Sciences in the United States, Vol. XIII, 1973–1977, no. 35-36, pp. 209–216.
 "Vertical and Horizontal Mechanisms in Complex Systems." Proceedings of the Twenty-Second Annual North Meeting of the Society of General Systems Research, Washington, D.C., February 13–15, 1978, pp. 276–280.
 "Quelques Commentaires sur les Mecanismes Verticaux et Horizontaux dans L'Economie Sovetique," Reveue D'Etudes Comparatives Est - Quest, Vol. 9, no. 4, 1978, pp. 7–20.
 "Domestic Factors Shaping Soviet Foreign Policy: Economic Conditions and Cultural Forces," Perceptions: Relations between the United States and the Soviet Union, United States Senate Committee on Foreign Relations, 1978, pp. 59–64.
 "L.V. Kantorovich, The Political Dilemma in the Scientific Creativity," Journal of Post Keynesian Economics, 1978–1979, Vol. 1, no. 2, pp. 129–147. The enlarged version of this article is published in Internal Contradic tions in the USSR, no. 2, 1982, Chalidze Publications, pp. 284–334 (In Russian) and in revised form in Ekonomika I Matematicheskie Metody, vol.33, no 3, 1997, pp. 31–42.
 "Interaction of Foreign and Economic Policy in the Soviet Union," The Papers of the Peace Science Society (International), Vol. 28, 1978, pp. 26–36. The enlarged version of this article is published in Internal Contradictions in the USSR, no. 4, 1982, Chalidze Publications, pp. 13–50, (in Russian).
 "Labile and Invariable Valuations," Paper was presented at the Fourth International Congress of Cybernatic & Systems, 21–25 August 1978, Amsterdam, The Netherlands (in press). (The Summary of the paper is published in the boo k Current Topics in Cybernetics and Systems, ed. by J. Rose, Springer-Verlag, 1978, pp. 253–254).
 "The Mechanisms of Distribution Consumer Goods and Services in the Soviet Economy." Paper was presented at the International Conference on the Service Sector of the Economy, University of Puerto Rico, June 26, July 1, 1978 (in press).
 My Meeting with a Prominent Turkish Poet: Nazim Hikmet, Edebiyat, Vol. IV, No. 2, 1979, pp. 191–192.
 "Creation as a General Systems Phenomenon," Proceedings of the Silver Anniversary International Meeting, Society for General Systems Research, London, England, August 20–24, 1979, pp. 76–80.
 "On Variety of Ideologies," Quarterly Journal of Ideology, Vol. iii, Spring 1980, no. 1, pp. 9–22.
 "Jews in Soviet Economic Science," Soviet Jewish Affairs, Vol. 11, no. 1, 1981, pp. 29–51.
 "Exchange and Values," Value Judgement and Income Distribution, ed. by R. Solo and C. Anderson, Praeger Publishers, 1981, pp. 165–184.
 "Divergence and Convergence as General Systems Categories," Proceedings of the Twenty-Fifth Annual North American Meeting of the Society for General Systems Research, Toronto, Canada, January 6–9, 1981, pp. 215–224.
 "Belief, Art and Science as General Systems Phenomena," Proceedings of the Tenth Annual Conference of the Southeastern Region of the Society for General Systems Research, April 21–23, 1981, Louisville, KY, pp. 239–246.
 "Some Regional Problems in the USSR," Planning under Regional Stagnation, eds. W. Buhz and P. Friedrich, Nomos Verlags-gellshaft, Baden-Baden, 1982, pp. 115–133; International Contradictions in the USSR, no. 5, 1982, pp. 10–43 (in Russian).
 Book review "Political Change and Social Development: The Case of the Soviet Union" by Alexander Shtromas. The Russian Review, vol.41,no.3,1982, p. 340.
 "A Little Bit on Russia's Awful Past, Hectic Present, and Shadowed "Future." The USSR: International Contradictions, No. 7, 1983, pp. 37–74 (in Russian).
 "Corruption in the USSR: Some methodological notes," Corruption, Causes, Consequences and Control, ed. by M. Clarke. Frances Pinter Publishers London, 1983, pp. 220–238. USSR: International Contradictions, no. 8, 19 83 (in Russian).
 "Openness of The Soviet Union." Paper delivered at the Fourth Annual Sewanee Economic Symposium, Market Economics, Planned Communism and the Third World: Economic Strength and Dependence, March 3–5, 1983, Sawanee, TN, USA (in press).
 "Indetermining the Future: A Systems Approach to Some Old Problems." 6th International Congress of Cybernetics and Systems of the WOGSC September 10–14, 1984, AFCET, Paris, Vol. 1., pp. 301–306.
 "Planning, Market and Measurement," Acta Slavica Iaponica, The Slavic Research Center, Hokkaido University, Sapporo, Japan, tomus II, 1984, pp. 1–13.
 "Some Notes on Vertical and Horizontal Economic Mechanism," Regional and Industrial Development Theories, Models and Empirical Evidence, ed. by A. Anderson, W. Isard, T. Puu, New York: North Holland 1984, pp. 383–405.
 "The Story of a Jewish Favorite: Aron Katsenelinboigen sounds great," Time and We, no. 81, 1984, pp. 172–202 (in Russian).
 "Some Comments on R. Ackoff's Concept of Interactive Planning." Planning for Human Systems: Essays in Honor of Russell L. Ackoff. Philadelphia: University of Pennsylvania Press, 1992, pp. 179–193.
 The Paradigm of the Manifold (Homogeneity) and the Singular Variety (Heterogeneity) as Applied to Social and Biological Systems. Proceedings of the International Conference Systems Inquiring: Theory, Philosophy, Methodology, Los Angeles, May 27–31, 1985, Vol. I, pp. 275–283. As an article was published in Terapia Familiar Epistemologia Sisteactica, no. 16, 1987 (in Spanish).
 "Mathematical Economics in the Soviet Union: A Reflection On the 25th Anniversary of L.V. Kantorovich's book: The Best Use of Economic Resources", Acta Slavica Iaponica,Vol. 4 (1986), pp. 88–103. Internal Contradictions in USSR, no. 15, 1986, pp. 46–79 (in Russian).
 "Toward a Model of Indeterministic Systems Development" (together with M. Kavesh). Proceedings of the International Conference of Mental Images, Values and Reality, May 26–30, 1986, Vol. 1, pp. 79–84.
 "Toward a Unified Theory of the Physiological Field" (together with D.Giacomo&M.Weissmark). Seventh International Congress of Cybernetics and Systems, London, September 3, 1986, pp. 376–378.
 "What to Undertake?" Country and World, no. 1(37), 1987, pp. 46–47 (in Russian).
 "Is the Soviet Union Changing?" Nation, June 13, 1987, p. 812.
 "Gorbachev's Paradox," Internal Contradictions in USSR, no. 19, 1987, pp. 97–181 (in Russian).
 "Respite or Change of the Tradition," Vremia i My, no. 96, 1987, pp. 104–128 (in Russian).
 "Will Glashost Bring the Reactionaries to Power?," Orbis, Spring 1988, pp. 217–230.
 Respond to the letter by prof. G.Gibian concerning my article [61], Orbis, Summer 1988, pp. 442–444.
 "Gorbachev's Paradox or How to Help Him to Enter in History" Vremia i My, no. 99, 1988, pp. 105–125 (in Russian).
 "Yanov vs. Solzhenitsyn", Vremia i My, no.100,1988, pp. 204–214 (in Russian).
 "Towards Constructing a Typology of Corporate Leadership". Systems Research, vol.6,no2, 1989, pp. 103–116.
 "Anti-Semitism and the Jews State", 22, no.64, 1989, pp. 165–188 (in Russian).
 "Some Notes on Anti-Semitism", Word, no.7-8 1990, pp. 121–142; no.12 1992, pp. 121–130.
 Answers on questions concerning the future of the Soviet Union, Vremia i My, No.108, 1990, pp. 149–151 (in Russian).
 "Beauty as a Measurement of Performance: An Introduction to the Calculus of Predispositions", Proceedingd 5th IEEE International Symposium on Intelligent Control, September 5–7, 1990, Philadelphia, pp. 98–103.
 Interview concerning the future of the Soviet Union, Vestnik, no.23,1991,pp. 8–11 (in Russian).
 "Change and Evolution". Systems Research, Vol.8,No4, 1991, pp. 77–93.
 "To Whom the Future Belongs? Thoughts Concerning Present State of the Past Soviet Union." Vremia i My,no.115,1992,pp. 148–164 (in Russian).
 "Russian Imperial Concept", Interview to the newspaper Novoe Russkoe Slovo, March 2,3,4,5,8, 9,10 1993 (in Russian).
 "A Szovjet gazdasag Militarizalasarol", 2000. December Mcmxciii, pp. 6–9 (in Hungarian)
 Dialog with Vera Zubareva concerning "angels". In the book "About Angels: A Treatise" by Vera Zubareva. Publisher: Odessa (Ukraine),1995, pp. 122–131.
 "Socio-Economic Mechanisms of Change and Biological Evolution". World Futures, Vol.46, 1996, pp. 171–193
 'Can One Measure Beauty?". The Coast, no, 5, 1996, pp.285-293 (in Russian).
 "Internal Mechanisms of Change." In Sustainable Peace in the World System, and the Next Evolution of Human Consciousness, Proceedings of the Fortieth Annual Meeting of the ISSS, July 14–19, 1996, pp. 365–376.
 "Is Capitalism a Danger for Modern Society?" Interview to the journal Vremia i My,no.135,1997, pp. 182–201 (in Russian).
 "Some Features of a Crossing Mechanism of Change." Proceedings of the Forty First Annual Meeting of the ISSS, Seoul, Korea, July 22–25, 1997, pp. 755–765.
 "Behind the Iron Curtain." Interview to the journal The Red and Blue, vol. LV, no. 3, 1997, pp. 6–8, 26-27.
 "Systemic Oneness. Systemic Vision of the Devil in Dostoevsky's The Brothers Karamazov." Transactions of the Association of Russian-American Scholars in the U.S.A., vol.XXVIII, New York, 1996–1997, pp. 303–311 (in Russian).
 A letter to the publisher of The New Review, book 210, 1998,pp. 323–325 (in Russian).
 "The Theory of Predispositioning and Literary Analysis." Slavic and East European Journal, volume 42, no.4, Winter, 1998, pp. 736–739.
 "In memory of Andrey Malishevski." (In Russian.) In the book A.V. Malishevski, Qualitative Models In the Theory of Complex Systems. Moscow: Nauka, 1998, pp. 519–521.
 "To the Strategy of Russian "perestrojka."  Kontinent, Appendix to no. 1, 1999, pp. 56–67 (in Russian).
 “God and Indeterministic God.” Creative Transformation. Vol. 9. No.4, 2000:14-18.
 “A Dialogue That Takes Place Somewhere and Still Continues.” In the book About Angels, About God, About Poetry by V. Ulea. University of West Alabama: Livingston Press, 2003, pp. 95–115.
 “The Language of Predispositioning.” Iconicity in Language. Internet Journal, 2003.
 "License for Subjectivity"

External links
 Site dedicated to Aron Katsenelinboigen
 Essay in Honor of Dr. Aron Katsenelinboigen
 In Memory of Dr. Aron Katsenelinboigen
 Vladimir Shlapentokh, Aron Katsenelinboigen «Word» 2006, №50 In Russian.

1927 births
2005 deaths
20th-century American philosophers
Systems scientists
Plekhanov Russian University of Economics alumni
Soviet emigrants to the United States
University of California, Berkeley staff
University of Pennsylvania staff